Crabro is a genus of square-headed wasps belonging to the family Crabronidae. There are at least 80 described species in Crabro, found in the Nearctic and Palaearctic (Holarctic).

Species

References

External links
 Catalog of Sphecidae California Academy of Sciences Institute of Biodiversity
Crabro images at Consortium for the Barcode of Life

Crabronidae
Apoidea genera